Hum may refer to:

Science
 Hum (sound), a sound produced with closed lips, or by insects, or other periodic motion
 Mains hum, an electric or electromagnetic phenomenon
 The Hum, an acoustic phenomenon
 Venous hum, a physiological sensation

Places

Historical
 Hum (zemlja), a medieval principality, now part of Bosnia and Herzegovina and Croatia

Bosnia and Herzegovina
 Mount Hum (Sarajevo), a hill north of Sarajevo
 Mount Hum (Mostar), a hill south of Mostar
 Hum, Bugojno, a village in the Federation of Bosnia and Herzegovina
 Hum, Foča, a village in Republika Srpska
 Hum, Trebinje, a village in Republika Srpska

Croatia
 Hum, Croatia, a town in Istria
 Mount Hum (Vis), a hill on the island of Vis in Dalmatia
 Mount Hum (Plaški), a hill in the region of mountainous Croatia
 Mount Hum (Lastovo), a hill on the island of Lastovo in Dalmatia

Serbia
 Hum (Niš), a village
 Hum (Pešter), a mountain on the border of Serbia and Montenegro

Slovenia
 Mount Hum (Laško), a hill in Styria
 Hum, Brda, a village in the Littoral region

United Kingdom 
 Humberside, former county in England, Chapman code HUM

Elsewhere 
 Houma–Terrebonne Airport, IATA code HUM, in Louisiana, United States
 Hum Island near Antarctica

People 
 Hum Jayega (1922–1992), Nepali Indian comedian
 Christopher Hum (born 1946), British diplomat
 Phan Văn Hùm (1902–1946), Vietnamese Trotskyist

Arts, entertainment, and media

Music 
 Hum (band), a band from Champaign, Illinois, US
 The Hum (Hookworms album), 2014
 The Hum (O'Hooley & Tidow album), 2014
 Hum (Eerie Wanda album), 2016
 "Hum", 2014 song by Tigers Jaw from Charmer
 The Hum, Unwritten Law album

Other uses in arts, entertainment, and media
 Hum (film), a 1991 Bollywood film
 Highly unusual method, or HUM, in contract bridge
 Hum FM, an Emirati radio station
 Hum TV, a Pakistani television channel

Other uses
 Honda of the UK Manufacturing, British motor vehicle assembler
 Verizon Hum, a vehicle diagnostic and tracking system